is a Japanese actress from Minoh, Osaka. She won the award for best actress at the 1st Yokohama Film Festival for the Nikkatsu Roman Porno film Angel Guts: Red Classroom. She also appeared in Nikkatsu's 1982 production Red Scandal: Affair, a "thinly-veiled replica of Luis Buñuel's Belle de Jour."

Filmography
 Angel Guts: Red Classroom (1979)
 Miracle Girl (1980 TV series)
 Red Scandal: Affair (1982)
 Okinawan Boys (1983)

References

1953 births
Living people
Japanese actresses
Pink film actors
People from Minoh, Osaka